Mexicana Universal Baja California (until 2016 called Nuestra Belleza Baja California) is a pageant in Baja California, Mexico, that selects that state's representative for the national Mexicana Universal pageant (before called Nuestra Belleza México).

The state organization has produced one winner for Miss World in 2003 being the first and only winner from the state to win a crown of Nuestra Belleza México/Mexicana Universal.

Nuestra Belleza Baja California is located at number 16 with two crown of Nuestra Belleza México/Mexicana Universal.

Titleholders
Below are the names of the annual titleholders of Mexicana Universal Baja California, listed in ascending order, and their final placements in the Mexicana Universal after their participation, until 2017 the names are as Nuestra Belleza Baja California.

1Nadia Ramos originally she was going to compete in 2007 but had to leave the competition due to a family emergency and given the opportunity to participate in 2008.

 Competed in Miss Universe.
 Competed in Miss World.
 Competed in Miss International.
 Competed in Miss Charm International.
 Competed in Miss Continente Americano.
 Competed in Reina Hispanoamericana.
 Competed in Miss Orb International.
 Competed in Nuestra Latinoamericana Universal.

Designated Contestants
As of 2000, isn't uncommon for some States to have more than one delegate competing simultaneously in the national pageant. The following Nuestra Belleza Baja California contestants were invited to compete in Nuestra Belleza México. Some have placed higher than the actual State winners.

1Nadia Ramos originally she was going to compete in 2007 but had to leave the competition due to a family emergency and given the opportunity to participate in 2008.

External links
Official Website

Nuestra Belleza México